Oliver Masucci (born 6 December 1968) is a German actor. He is best known internationally for the role of Adolf Hitler in the 2015 film adaptation of the satirical novel Look Who's Back, Ulrich Nielsen in the Netflix series Dark, and Anton Vogel in Fantastic Beasts: The Secrets of Dumbledore.

Early life
He was born in Stuttgart, but raised in Bonn. His father is Italian, his mother German. The family ran several restaurants in Bonn. He has three children.

Career

Masucci played Adolf Hitler in Er ist wieder da (Look Who's Back), adapted from the book of the same name. Some scenes were unscripted and consisted of filming the reactions of people on the street to Masucci as he traveled the country dressed up as Hitler. Masucci was surprised to find that many people acted as if they were glad to see the Nazi leader. He has used the opportunity to speak out against racism. The role earned him a nomination as best actor in a leading role at the Deutscher Filmpreis in 2016.

Masucci became famous for his 2017 to 2020 role as Ulrich Nielsen on Netflix’s German language time travel show Dark. “‘For the world, of course, I became famous with Dark. And that was pretty nice, because I have friends everywhere now. When I go to Rome, I get treated very well in the restaurants, and I get treated very well on the streets in New York. No one’s screaming and shouting, and I hope it will never be that way, because for the moment, this is quite nice,’ says Masucci.”

Masucci portrayed German film director Rainer Werner Fassbinder in the 2020 film Enfant Terrible directed by Oskar Roehler.

Filmography

References

External links

 Official website 
 

1968 births
Living people
Actors from Bonn
German male film actors
German people of Italian descent